Arroyo Sequit Park is a unit within the Santa Monica Mountains National Recreation Area, located at 34138 Mulholland Highway, inland from Malibu in southeastern Ventura County, California.

The park is in the Santa Monica Mountains, and is managed by the National Park Service. The preserve includes a looping nature trail.

See also
 Flora of the Santa Monica Mountains
 God's Seat
 Mulholland Highway

External links
 NPS: Official Arroyo Sequit  park map

Santa Monica Mountains National Recreation Area
Parks in Ventura County, California
Santa Monica Mountains
Mulholland Highway
Malibu, California
Tourist attractions in Malibu, California